Geoffrey Horsman Coles (13 March 1871 – 27 January 1916) was a British sport shooter who competed at the 1908 Summer Olympics.

In the 1908 Olympics he won a bronze medal in the team pistol event and was 11th in the individual pistol event.

Coles was killed in action during the First World War, serving as a private with the Royal Fusiliers near Festubert. He was buried at Brown's Road Military Cemetery nearby.

See also
 List of Olympians killed in World War I

References

External links
profile

1871 births
1916 deaths
Sportspeople from Hastings
British male sport shooters
Olympic shooters of Great Britain
Shooters at the 1908 Summer Olympics
Olympic bronze medallists for Great Britain
Royal Fusiliers soldiers
British military personnel killed in World War I
Olympic medalists in shooting
Medalists at the 1908 Summer Olympics
British Army personnel of World War I